Keith Neller (born 2 January 1960) is an Australian former professional rugby league footballer who played in the 1980s and 1990s.

Playing career

Challenge Cup Final appearances
Neller played right-, i.e. number 10, in Halifax's 19–18 victory over St. Helens in the 1987 Challenge Cup Final during the 1986–87 season at Wembley Stadium, London on Saturday 2 May 1987, and played right- in the 32–12 defeat by Wigan in the 1988 Challenge Cup final during the 1987–88 season at Wembley Stadium, London on Saturday 30 April 1988.

References

External links

Australian rugby league players
Gold Coast Chargers players
Halifax R.L.F.C. players
Living people
Place of birth missing (living people)
Rugby league props
1960 births